Sayed Ziaul Haq (1928–1988) was a Sufi saint of the Maizbhanderi Sufi order, also known as Bisso Wali , Shahenshah, Zia Baba and Shahenshah Sayed Ziaul Haq Maizbhanderi Kaddasa Sirhul Ajiz.

Born
He was born at Maizbhandar in Chittagong district, British India (now Bangladesh) on Tuesday morning, 25 December 1928; Poush 10, 1335 BC; Rajab 12, l347 AH. Initially he was named as Sayed Badiur Rahman on the 7th day of his birth. Hence, his father Sayed Delaor Husaein renamed him as Sayed Ziaul Haq according to a heavenly commandment and mother Sayeda Sajeda Khatun was the 2nd daughter of Baba Bhanderi.

Education
Firstly, house tutor Moulavi Mozammel Haq taught him the Arabic alphabetic elementary level, Then had been learning up-to class three at Maizbhandar Ahmadia Junior Madrasa He get admitted at class five and studied up-to eight at  Nanupur Abu Sobhan High School. Later, he studied class nine-ten and passed the Entrance Examination from Chittagong Collegiate School in 1949. After accomplishing intermediate Level (I.A.) from Chittagong College, while as a student of Kanongopara Sir Ashotos Government Degree College of Boalkhali, appeared at 3rd examination of bachelor's degree (B.A.), his condition became unstable having mysterious experience, in fact, came out of the examination hall submitting blank answer script, that remain the enclosing remark of his institutional education.

Sufi perspective
It is firmly known that, encountering such a spiritual experience, he straightly returned to Maizbhander at Fatikchari from Boalkhali. Since then, his mysteriously eventful life get an esoteric state of Sufi. While Sufi meditation (Reajat/Muraqaba/Moshaheda) he sometimes used to refuse food and remain consistently sleepless for several days, very often he used to dive in severe cold pound water even in intensive winter season for a couple of days. Meanwhile, he also used to stay alone in a closed door room being detached from all mundane  intercourse for days long.

There has noted in various published hagiography, while his father was upset regarding son's abnormal attitude, get a Sainthood inspiration in dream by Sayed Ahmed Ullah Maizbhanderi saying, "Why are you so anxious? Let you ware him my green long Cloak (jubba)". The father immediately put the dress wearing on his son, since then, Sayed Ziaul Haq's attitude get a remarkable change remaining calm and quiet. Hagiographers noted him as a Majjub-e-Salek (/ ), used to travel over days across hills, forest, seaside and different places sleeplessly without any pre-arrangement. He is memorable for a huge number of mysterious/Karamath events. He succeeded the spiritual chain/Shajrah of his Sufi master as well as father, that goes to Sayed Ahmed Ullah Maizbhanderi through Sayed Aminul Haq Wasel (Choto Moulana).

Sobriquet
Among millions of affectionate throughout the world, he is well known through some sobriquet, two of those achieved noteworthy status. Bishaw Wali can be translated as the Universal Sufi Saint or Global Sufi is his most used title. Followers also used to utter him as Shahenshah Babajan since his early age of meditation.

Family
On January 28, 1955, he married Sayeda Monwara Begum, the youngest daughter of Late Badaruzzaman Chowdhury (Badan Sikder). On January 16, 1982, his father died, was a Sufi saint and a remarkable author. According to the genealogical lineage he is a descendant of the Islamic prophet Mohammed through Sayed Abdul Qader Gilani and Fatimah Zahra.

Legacy
He left five daughters and one son. His only son Sayed Muhammad Hasan also known as 'Mawla Hujur', 'Hasan Mawla'. After accomplishing his M.A. in English, Mawla Hujur is acting as the Sajjadanashin  of his Sufi rituals as well as the President of Maizbhandari Academy and Trusty of Shahanshah Hadrath Sayed Ziaul Haq Maizbhandari Trust, established to spread and publicized Sayed Ziaul Haq's teachings and thought among the society. The trust is operating a number of schools, orphanages, cultural and social welfare institutes. He is the prganizer of annual International Sufi Conference, Bangladesh.

Death
He died on October 12, 1988, at the age of 60.

Shrine
Nowadays, a latest designed tomb/ majar by architect Alamgir Kabir having the look of lily constructed since 1993 to 1997, get an status of modern monument. Every year, millions of devotees from different countries visit the majar on his ORS Mobarak.

See also

 List of Sufi Saints of South Asia
 Abdul-Qadir Gilani
 Golamur Rahman Maizbhandari (Baba Bhandari)
 Ghous-e-Azam
 Ibn Arabi
 Dervish
 Fakir

References

External links
 Welcome to Maizbhandar Darbar Sharif: An Emblem of Human Regalement
 Maizbhander Mainia, An adobe of Quest for Truth
 Maizbhander Dorbar Sharif 
 Official Website of Rahe Bhander Sufi Order, Rahe Bhander Kadhurkhil School of Mono-Theology

Sufism
Sufism in Bangladesh